Ted Marcelino (born ) is a Canadian politician, who was elected to the Legislative Assembly of Manitoba in the 2011 election. A member of the New Democratic Party, he was the first member of the Legislative Assembly for the electoral district of Tyndall Park. He represented it from its creation at the 2011 election until he was defeated in the 2019 election.

He is the brother-in-law of his former caucus colleague Flor Marcelino.

Electoral record

References

Living people
1940s births
New Democratic Party of Manitoba MLAs
Canadian politicians of Filipino descent
Politicians from Winnipeg
21st-century Canadian politicians